Nallavan Vazhvan is a 1961 Indian Tamil-language crime thriller film produced and directed by P. Neelakantan. The film stars M. G. Ramachandran and Rajasulochana. It revolves around a man who is sentenced to death on false charges, and escapes from prison to clear his name.

Nallavan Vazhvan is the 50th film for Ramachandran as an actor. The screenplay was written by C. N. Annadurai, from a story by Na. Pandurangan, and cinematography was handled by G. Durai. The film was released on 31 August 1961 and underperformed at the box office, with a theatrical run of 80 days.

Plot 

Muthu, a convict sentenced to death on false charges of murder, escapes from prison. He will have to himself confuse the culprit, Nallasivam, the local personality, of the most well-to-do, above suspicion, a priori. During his escape, disguised as a shaman, Muthu leads an investigation, and finds that the matter rests on the indestructible support of some women. First of all, his young and beautiful Chandra (that he saved formerly, captivated in the hands of Nallasivam), of its mother and the one that he considers as his young sister Chenbagame. But the husband of the latter, the inspector of police, in charge of this case, Madhavan, friend, nevertheless, Muthu, convinced of his guilt, does not stop pursuing him. However, the hired men thrown by Nallasivam cross the region in search of the fugitive to kill him. In front of such threats, will Muthu manage to put, in time, the hand on the unique witness which could exonerate him?

Cast 
Male cast
 M. G. Ramachandran as Muthu
 M. R. Radha as Nallasivam
 M. N. Nambiar as Inspector Madhavan
D. Balasubramaniam as Nallasivam's clerk
 S. Rama Rao as Makeup Meganathan

Female cast
 Rajasulochana as Chandra
 E. V. Saroja as Chenbagame
Lakshmi Prabha as Muthu's mother
P. S. Seethalaksmi as the witness

Production 
Nallavan Vazhvan was produced and directed by P. Neelakantan under Arasu Pictures. The screenplay was written by C. N. Annadurai, from a story by Na. Pandurangan. It was the 50th film for M. G. Ramachandran as an actor. Cinematography was handled by G. Durai.

Soundtrack 
The soundtrack was composed by T. R. Pappa, with lyrics by M. K. Athmanathan and Vaali. This was the first Ramachandran film for which Vaali wrote lyrics. The team initially rejected the lyrics Vaali wrote for the song "Sirikindraal Indru Sirikindraal" and wanted A. Maruthakasi to write new lyrics, but Maruthakasi convinced the team to retain Vaali's lyrics. The song contains the lyrics "Udayasooriyan ethiril irundhal, ullai thamarai malaratho" (in front of the rising sun, the lotus of one's heart blooms), where the "rising sun" is a reference to the Dravida Munnetra Kazhagam's election symbol.

Release and reception 
Nallavan Vazhvan was released on 31 August 1961. The film underperformed at the box office and ran for 80 days in theatres.

References

External links 
 

1960s crime thriller films
1960s Tamil-language films
1961 films
Films about miscarriage of justice
Films directed by P. Neelakantan
Films scored by T. R. Pappa
Indian crime thriller films